William McGlen (27 April 1921 – 23 December 1999) was an English professional footballer who played as a wing half and midfielder. Born in Bedlington, Northumberland, he played for Blyth Spartans, Manchester United, Lincoln City and Oldham Athletic. McGlen played 110 times in the Football League, scoring two goals. McGlen lived in Manchester for most of his life until retiring to Lincolnshire, where he died in December 1999.

References

1921 births
1999 deaths
English footballers
Association football wing halves
Manchester United F.C. players
Lincoln City F.C. players
Oldham Athletic A.F.C. players
People from Bedlington
Footballers from Northumberland
Blyth Spartans A.F.C. players
English Football League players